"Scissors in the Sand" is a single by Echo & the Bunnymen which was released on 5 June 2006 on the Cooking Vinyl label. It was the third single to be released from the band's 2005 album, Siberia.

Overview
Like their previous two singles, "Stormy Weather" and "In the Margins", and the parent album, this single was produced by Hugh Jones who had previously produced the band's 1981 album Heaven Up Here. The cover photograph was taken by Joe Dilworth. The live version of "Villiers Terrace" was taken from the band's 2005 appearance at the Reading Festival.

Reception
Reviewing the single, Room Thirteen described the song as "classic Bunnymen", that the song compared to their mid-1980s releases and scored it with 11 out of 13. Reviewing the album Siberia, The Pitt News described "Scissors in the Sand" as the album's most ambitious and strongest track, the reviewer also states that the song sees McCulloch at his most intense and also comments favourably on Sergeant's guitar solo.

The single failed to chart.

Track listings
"Scissors in the Sand" (radio edit) (Will Sergeant, Ian McCulloch) – 3:17
"In the Margins" (acoustic) (Sergeant, McCulloch) – 4:56
"Villiers Terrace" (live) (Sergeant, McCulloch, Les Pattinson, Pete de Freitas) – 5:28

Personnel

Musicians
 Ian McCulloch – vocals, guitar
 Will Sergeant – lead guitar
 Peter Wilkinson – bass
 Paul Fleming – keyboards
 Simon Finley – drums

Production
 Hugh Jones – producer
 Joe Dilworth – photography

References

2006 singles
Echo & the Bunnymen songs
Songs written by Ian McCulloch (singer)
Songs written by Will Sergeant
Song recordings produced by Hugh Jones (producer)